The Groz-Beckert KG is part of the Groz-Beckert Group based in Albstadt-Ebingen in Baden-Wuerttemberg, Germany. Groz-Beckert is the world's leading provider of industrial needles, precision components and fine tools as well as systems and services for the production and joining of textiles. Founded in 1852, the company is still family-owned. On 31 December 2021 the group of companies had around 8,700 employees, of which 2,203 worked at the headquarters in Albstadt. Groz-Beckert is the largest employer of the Zollernalbkreis. In the business year 2021 the company generated a turnover of 742 mil. Euro.

History 
In 1852 Theodor Groz opened a store for toys and fashion accessories with an attached needle workshop in Ebingen, today part of Albstadt. In the same year he produced needles for warp knitting and hosiery production for the first time. In 1871 Ernst Beckert founded the identically-named company "Ernst Beckert" in Eibenberg, near Chemnitz, for the production of needles. In 1884 Ernst Beckert relocated his needle factory to Chemnitz.
Already in 1888 Theodor Groz & Söhne founded their own health insurance fund for their employees – the precursor of today's BKK Groz-Beckert.
In 1937 the two companies merged, laying the foundation of the present group of companies. At that time, Walther Groz was the Head of the Executive Board of the company. Today, besides the headquarters there are further production sites all over the world (Germany, Belgium, Czech Republic, Portugal, India, China, Vietnam, USA). Also sales affiliates can be found around the globe (Germany, Czech Republic, Italy, France, Spain, Great Britain, Turkey, Mexico, USA, India, China, Vietnam, South Korea, Indonesia, Japan, Singapore). 

From 1996 to 2018 the company was chaired by Dr. Thomas Lindner (* 1951), a descendant of one of the founders. Since 2019 he has been Chairman of the Groz-Beckert Supervisory Board. Lindner was also President of the VDMA from 2010 to 2013.

Range of products
Groz-Beckert is producer of industrial needles and system parts for the knitting, apparel, shoe, nonwovens, and carpet industry (gauge parts tufting). In addition to that, the range of products includes weaving accessories like healds, heald frames, warp stop motions, and drop wires. In the beginning, these products were sold under the name "Grob by Groz-Beckert", now they go by "Groz-Beckert", and also machines for weaving preparation are part of the range. With its product group Customized Precision Components (CPC), formerly Ceramic Punching Components, Groz-Beckert went into a new field of application of precision tools. The products are carbide tools, punches, and dies for special machines as well as precision micro-components. Since the end of 2006 also cylinders and dials for circular knitting machines are produced (former SMC). Under the name of "SMG", another line of business produces and sells plastic ball bearings and components as well as first class plastic technology products. Also the brands "Eisbär by Groz-Beckert", Schmeing", "Knotex", and "Grob by Groz-Beckert" belong to the group. Today the following products are sold under the name of "Groz-Beckert":

 Knitting machine parts (knitting needles, system parts, cylinders, dials)
 Weaving machine parts (healds, heald frames, warp stop motions, drop wires, machines for weaving preparation)
 Parts for nonwoven production (products for the nonwovens-industry, felting and structuring needles, jet strips for hydroentanglement)
 Gauge parts tufting (tufting needles, loopers and tufting knives, reed finger modules)
 Products for carding process (card wires and clothings for the short staple and long staple spinning industry and for the nonwovens industry, mounting service, roller repair, commissioning service)
 Sewing machine parts (sewing machine needles, shoe machine needles, needles for domestic sewing machines, INH Quality Management)
 Further products (customized precision components (CPC), plastic products (SMG))

Research and development 
In 2010 the company inaugurated its Technology and Development Center (TEZ) at its headquarters in Albstadt. Laboratories, a training center, development offices and seminar rooms as well as machinery for all important textile production processes are placed on an area of around 25,000 square meters.

At ITMA 2015, Groz-Beckert present products and services as well as its new booth concept with machines made of acrylic glass and for the first time, showcase its carding division.

Social commitment 
In September 2013 Groz-Beckert inaugurated its Health and Education Center (GEBIZ) at its headquarters in Albstadt. Besides "Kita und Grundschule Malesfelsen" - a day care center and a private elementary school, the GEBIZ also includes the "Vitalzentrum Malesfelsen", a health center for its employees and the BKK insurance fund members. It provides a prevention and training area with an attached wellness and relaxation room. In addition to that, the vital center includes a public physiotherapeutic office.

In total, Groz-Beckert invested around 17.5 mil. Euro into this project.

References

External links 
 Groz-Beckert Website
 Guide to the Groz-Beckert Portfolio of Print Reproductions Related to the History of the Knitting Industry circa 1974

Manufacturing companies of Germany
Companies based in Baden-Württemberg
Zollernalbkreis